The 2017–18 Scottish Junior Cup was the 132nd season of the Scottish Junior Cup, the national knockout tournament for member clubs of the Scottish Junior Football Association (SJFA). The winner of this competition entered the following season's Scottish Cup at the preliminary round stage.

Calendar
The provisional dates for each round of the 2017–18 tournament are as follows:

Drawn matches are replayed and replays that end in a draw proceed direct to a penalty shootout, there is no extra time. Semi-finals are played home and away over two legs with the winner on aggregate progressing to the final. If the aggregate score is tied at the end of the second leg, the match will also proceed direct to a penalty shootout.

First round
The four junior clubs qualified for this season's Scottish Cup, are not included in the draw for the first round:
Banks O' Dee - North Superleague champions (automatic qualifiers via National Club Licensing (NCL) award in any case)
Girvan - in possession of NCL award
Glenafton Athletic - West of Scotland Super League Premier Division champions and Scottish Junior Cup holders
Linlithgow Rose - in possession of NCL award

The first round draw took place at Hampden Park, Glasgow on 22 August 2017 and was made by SJFA president Felix McKenna and Linlithgow Rose club president Les Donaldson.

Notes

Replays

Second round

The second round draw took place at Hampden Park, Glasgow on 4 October 2017 at 2pm.

Notes

Replays

Third round

Notes

Replays

Notes

Fourth round

Replay

Fifth round

Quarter-finals

Replay

Semifinals
The draw for the semi finals took place on 29 March 2018.

First leg

Second leg

Hurlford United won 2–1 on aggregate

Auchinleck Talbot won 2–1 on aggregate

Final
The Final of the Scottish Junior Cup was played at Rugby Park, Kilmarnock on Sunday 4 June with a 4.15pm kick off. The game was televised live by BBC ALBA.

References

4
Scottish Junior Cup seasons